Gustav Alfred Julius Meyer (5 October 1891 – 11 April 1945) was a Nazi Party official and politician. He joined the Nazi Party in 1928 and was the Gauleiter of North Westphalia from 1931 to 1945, the Oberpräsident of the Province of Westphalia from 1938 to 1945 and the Reichsstatthalter of Lippe and Schaumburg-Lippe from 1933 to 1945.

By the time of his death at the end of World War II in Europe, he was a State Secretary and Deputy Reichsminister in the Reich Ministry for the Occupied Eastern Territories (Reichsministerium für die Besetzten Ostgebiete or Ostministerium). He represented the ministry with Georg Leibbrandt in the January 1942 Wannsee Conference, at which the genocidal Final Solution to the Jewish Question was planned.

Meyer committed suicide in April 1945.

Early life 

Meyer was born in Göttingen, the son of a Prussian civil servant who was stationed in Göttingen due to his official duties. The middle-class family was originally from Essen. He was educated at the Gymnasium in Soest, graduating in 1911.

In 1912 he became a Fahnenjunker (cadet officer) with Infantry Regiment 68 (Koblenz), passing his officer exam in 1913 and being promoted to Leutnant. During World War I he fought with Infantry Regiment 363 on the Western Front, earning the Iron Cross First and Second Class and the Wound Badge. Promoted to Oberleutnant in June 1916, he was wounded and captured by the French in April 1917. This experience, according to Meyer, was especially traumatic and left him with a hatred against France. Released from captivity in March 1920, the downsized Reichswehr had no use for him and he left the army in October with the rank of Hauptmann (Captain).

After the war, Meyer studied jurisprudence and political science at the Universities of Bonn and then Würzburg. He graduated with a PhD in 1922 and joined the legal department of a Gelsenkirchen mining firm. In 1924, he joined the local Masonic lodge. Meyer was also the chairman of the local Kyffhäuserbund unit. He married Dorothee Capell in 1925 and had five daughters with her.

Third Reich 

In April 1928, Meyer joined the Nazi Party. The party was still extremely weak in Westphalia during the late 1920s, and had only circa three hundred members in the city of Gelsenkirchen during this period. In less than a year Meyer rose to the position of Ortsgruppenleiter (Local Group Leader) and in November 1929 he was promoted to Bezirksleiter (District Leader) of the Emscher-Lippe district within Westphalia. In November 1929, he was also elected as the only Nazi party representative to the Gelsenkirchen city council.

In September 1930 he became a member of the Reichstag from electoral constituency 17, North Westphalia, and on 31 January 1931 NSDAP Gauleiter of North Westphalia. On 14 September 1932, he was elected to the Prussian Landtag. Following the Nazi seizure of power in 1933, Meyer was appointed federal Reichsstatthalter (Reich Governor) of the German States of Lippe and Schaumburg-Lippe on 16 May 1933. On 1 August 1934, he was named to Hans Frank's Academy for German Law. Additionally, he also became the Staatsminister (Minister of State) in charge of the state government of Lippe, succeeding Hans-Joachim Riecke effective 1 February 1936. He also was named a Minister of State in the Schaumburg-Lippe government of Landespräsident (State President) . Finally, on 4 November 1938 he was made Oberpräsident of the Prussian Province of Westphalia, thus uniting under his control the highest party and governmental offices in his jurisdictions. He was promoted to SA-Gruppenführer on 20 April 1936 and to SA-Obergruppenführer on 9 November 1938.

On 6 September 1939, Meyer was made Chef der Zivilverwaltung (Chief of Civil Administration) in the West.  On 29 May 1940 he was appointed Acting Reich Defense Commissioner for Military District VI during the absence in Norway of Josef Terboven. On 17 July 1941 he became Staatssekretär (State Secretary) and Deputy to Alfred Rosenberg in the Reich Ministry for the Occupied Eastern Territories. Meyer was responsible for the departments of politics, administration and economics. In his role in the East, he used workers that were mainly Jewish for slave labor assigned to a variety of works. In January 1942 Meyer, as Rosenberg's representative, attended the Wannsee Conference that was called to discuss the Final Solution. On 16 November that year, he was made Reich Defense Commissioner for his Gau, and on 25 September 1944, he became the commander of Nazi Volksturm forces there.

Death 
Meyer was found dead on 11 April 1945, by the River Weser. The cause of death was suicide, most likely prompted by Germany's impending defeat in the war.

Fictional portrayals 

In the 2001 HBO film Conspiracy,  Meyer was played by Brian Pettifer.

References

Sources

External website
 

1891 births
1945 suicides
Gauleiters
Holocaust perpetrators
Members of the Academy for German Law
Members of the Reichstag of Nazi Germany
Members of the Reichstag of the Weimar Republic
Nazi Party officials
Nazi Party politicians
Nazis who committed suicide in Germany
Politicians from Göttingen
People from the Province of Hanover
Prussian Army personnel
Recipients of the Iron Cross (1914), 1st class
Recipients of the Iron Cross (1914), 2nd class
Sturmabteilung officers
University of Bonn alumni
Volkssturm personnel
Provincial Presidents of Westphalia
German Army personnel of World War I